Lalola was an Argentine television comedy show that aired from 28 August 2007 to 29 April 2008. It was broadcast by TV channel América 2. It starred Carla Peterson and Luciano Castro as protagonists. The show won nine Martín Fierro Awards for 2007, and also the Gold Prize.

A pilot for an American version, entitled "Eva Adams", was filmed for the Fox network starring Rhea Seehorn and James Van Der Beek in 2009. It was envisioned as a dramedy, in the vein of how Yo soy Betty la fea was adapted for American audiences as Ugly Betty, but wasn't picked up for a regular series.

Synopsis 
Ramiro "Lalo" Padilla (played by Juan Gil Navarro) is the director of the media company "High Five", editor of the famous magazine Don, and has many women around him. Romina (played by Marcela Kloosterboer), who is in love with Lalo, decides to punish his lack of commitment to her. She hires a witch to cast a spell on him, which turns him into a very beautiful woman, as Romina wanted him to know what it is like for a woman who is being harassed.

Lalo (now played by Carla Peterson) awakes as a woman, in a state of utter confusion. However, Lalo's friend Graciela ("Grace") Neira (played by Muriel Santa Ana) believes what happened as she heard Romina's phone call to Lalo's home saying what she did. As it seems unlikely anyone else will believe that Ramiro has been magically transformed, so Ramiro assumes a new identity: Dolores "Lola" Padilla, cousin of Lalo. Lalo "had to make an urgent trip to Germany because his father became ill", and has appointed Lola to take his place. While trying to find a way to change back, there are a whole new set of challenges to face that Lalo didn't have to experience before, both within and outside the workplace.

Cast and characters 
 Carla Peterson ... Dolores "Lola" Padilla / Daniela Calori
 Luciano Castro ... Facundo "Nando" Canavaro
 Muriel Santa Ana ... Graciela "Grace" Neira
 Rafael Ferro ... Gastón Zacks
 Agustina Lecouna ... Natalia Aguirre
 Luis Ziembrowski ... Donato Aguirre
 Sandra Ballesteros ... Vicky
 Violeta Urtizberea ... Julia
 Lola Berthet ... Soledad
 Víctor Malagrino ... Patricio "Pato" Miguel
 Diana Lamas ... Griselda
 Tomás de las Heras ... Nicolás
 Nahuel Mutti ... Boogie
 Matías Desiderio ... Martín
 Chela Cardalda ... Iris
 Bruna Castro ... Melisa
 Reina Reech ... Carola Aguirre
 Pablo Cedrón ... Teo
 Juan Gil Navarro ... Ramiro "Lalo" Padilla
 Marcela Kloosterboer ... Romina

Theme Songs 
This telenovela has two theme songs, "Hola" and "Enamorada", both are sung by Miranda!.

International remakes 
The show has been officially remade in 12 other countries: Portugal, Chile, Peru, Spain, Belgium, Greece, Turkey, Russia, India, Vietnam, Indonesia and the Philippines. All of these remakes start with mostly the same initial premise but many of them head in very different narrative directions and ultimate conclusions than the original show.

International broadcast

References 

Golden Martín Fierro Award winners
2007 telenovelas
2007 Argentine television series debuts
2008 Argentine television series endings
Argentine telenovelas
América TV original programming
Spanish-language telenovelas